Archyala terranea is a species of moth in the family Tineidae. It was described by Arthur Gardiner Butler in 1879. This species is endemic to New Zealand. This species has been recorded as being on the wing from December to February.

Larvae feed in moss on rocks and pupates amongst the moss in a rough, dense cocoon.

A. terranea has been collected in Wellington, Christchurch, Castle hill, Dunedin, and Lake Wakatipu.

References

External links

 Citizen science observation of Archyala terranea giving a photo

Moths described in 1879
Tineidae
Moths of New Zealand
Endemic fauna of New Zealand
Taxa named by Arthur Gardiner Butler
Endemic moths of New Zealand